Luigi Pernier (Rome, 23 November 1874 – Rhodes, 18 August 1937) was an Italian archaeologist and academic now best known for his discovery of the Disc of Phaistos.

Career

Pernier came from a wealthy family—his father Giuseppe was a rich landowner of French descent and his mother Agnese Romanini belonged to an aristocratic family.  He attended the Liceo Ginnasio "Ennio Quirino Visconti" before graduating in Letters at the University of Rome in 1897, with Rodolfo Lanciani as his supervisor. He specialised at the Scuola di Archeologia di Roma, gaining a diploma in 1901, after spending periods studying in Crete at the Missione Archeologica Italiana under Federico Halbherr.

From 1902 to 1916 he was inspector of 'Museums, Galleries and Excavations of Antiquities' in  Florence and carried out research at several central Italian sites; at the same time he joined the Italian Mission to Crete, directing its operations from 1906 to 1909 in place of Halbherr while the latter was detained in Italy. It was at this time that Pernier was involved in the discovery of the Phaistos Disc. In 1904 he married Tonina Falchi, daughter of Isidoro Falchi, who had discovered the site of Vetulonia. From 1909 he was the first director of the newly established Italian Archaeological School of Athens.

In 1914 he was made director of the Archaeological Museum of Florence, giving up his directorship of the Athens school. In 1916 he was appointed superintendent of excavations and archaeological museums of Etruria, a position he held until 1922, when he became professor of archaeology and ancient art history at the University of Florence. Pernier spent long periods abroad during this time, especially in the summer, on Crete or in Cyrene. On Crete, from 1928 to 1929, he completed the excavations on the palace at Phaistos before becoming director of the Italian Archaeological Mission on Halbherr's death in 1930. 

At Cyrene, from 1925 to 1936, Pernier carried out ten excavation campaigns as part of the Italian Archaeological Mission and (with Carlo Anti) led the excavations on the Sanctuary of Apollo. These duties kept him on the move so much that he died abroad, on Rhodes, where he was leading a course organised by the Società Dante Alighieri.

Integrity
In summer 2008 Jerome Eisenberg, described by The Times as "a specialist in faked ancient art", accused Pernier of having forged his best known find, the Disc of Phaistos. A symposium was convoked to discuss the Disc in autumn 2008. Eisenberg argues that the disc can be dated by a thermoluminescence test, but in 2009 the Greek curators would not permit the disc to be examined. 
The authenticity of the Phaistos disc is supported by multiple discoveries made after the disc was excavated in 1908. A sealing found in 1955 shows the only known parallel to sign 21 (the “comb”) of the Phaistos disc. At the symposium, Eisenberg's hypothesis was therefore dismissed.

Works
 A proposito di alcuni lavori eseguiti recentemente nell'interno del Teatro di Marcello. Roma : Tipografia della Reale Accademia dei Lincei, 1901
 Commemorazione del socio Federico Halbherr fatta dal corrispondente. Roma, Dott. Giovanni Bardi tipografo della Reale Accademia Nazionale dei Lincei, 1931
 Di una citta ellenica arcaica scoperta a Creta dalla Missione italiana. Roma : Calzone, 1909
 Heliogabalus : M. Aurelius Antoninus. Roma : L. Pasqualucci, 1911
 Il disco di Phaestos con caratteri pittografici. Roma : tip. dell'Unione editrice, 1909
 Il palazzo minoico di Festos : Scavi e studi della missione archeologica italiana a creta dal 1900 al 1934. Vol. I. Gli strati piu antichi e il primo palazzo. (r. Istituto d'archeologia e storia dell'arte). Roma : Ist. Poligr. Dello Stato, Libreria, 1935
 Il palazzo minoico di Festos : scavi e studi della Missione archeologica italiana a Creta dal 1900 al 1934. Roma : Libreria dello Stato
 Il tempio e l'altare di Apollo a Cirene : scavi e studi dal 1925 al 1934 : con 126 illustrazioni e dodici tavole fuori testo. Bergamo : Istituto italiano d'arti grafiche, 1935
 L'Odeum dell'Agorà di Gortina presso il Leteo. Bergamo : Istituto Italiano d'Arti Grafiche, 1927
 La raccolta archeologica Bargagli a Sarteano presso Chiusi. Siena : Stab. d'Arti grafiche S. Bernardino, 1920
 Lavori eseguiti a Festos dalla Missione Archeologica Italiana dal 15 febbraio al 28 giugno 1901 : relazione. Roma : [s.n.], 1901
 Lavori eseguiti dalla Missione Archeologica italiana nel palazzo di Phaestos dal 10 Febbraio al 28 maggio 1902 : relazione. Roma : Tipografia della Reale Accademia dei Lincei, 1903
 Lavori eseguiti dalla missione archeologica italiana in Creta dal 2 aprile al 12 settembre 1906 : relazione di Luigi Pernier al prof. Ettore De Ruggiero .... Roma : Tipografia della Reale Accademia dei Lincei, 1907
 Luigi Savignoni e la sua opera scientifica. Firenze : Stab. tip. E. Ariani, 1918
 Mura laterizie e terrecotte figurate di Arezzo antica. Roma : Tipografia della Reale Accademia naz. dei Lincei, 1920
 Nuove scoperte archeologiche a Tarquinii : (1904-1906). Roma : Tipografia della Reale Accademia dei Lincei, 1907
 Per lo studio del tempio etrusco. Roma : Nuova Antologia, 1927
 Recenti scoperte archeologiche degl'italiani a Creta. Roma : Nuova Antologia, 1927
 Ricognizioni archeologiche nelle sporadi. Roma : E. Calzone, 1914, Tip. Ed. Romana
 Ricordi di storia etrusca e di arte greca della città di Vetulonia. Roma : Tipografia della Reale Accademia dei Lincei, 1914
 Scavi della missione archeologica italiana in Creta nel 1907. Roma : Calzone, 1907
 Scavi della missione italiana a Phaestos, 1900-1901 : rapporto preliminare. Roma : Tipgrafia della Reale Accademia dei Lincei, 1902
 Studi sul teatro di Marcello. Roma : Tipografia Cuggiani, 1928
 Templi arcaici sulla Patela di Prinias : contributo allo studio dell'arte dedalica. Bergamo : Istituto Italiano d'Arti Grafiche, 1914
 Tombe eneolitiche del Viterbese (Roma). Parma : Stab. tipo-litografico L. Battei, 1905
 Tumulo con tomba monumentale al Sodo presso Cortona. Roma : Bardi, 1925
 Un singolare monumento della scrittura pittografica cretese. Roma : Tipografia della Reale Accademia dei Lincei, 1909
 Vestigia di una Citta ellenica arcaica in Creta. Milano : U. Hoepli, 1912

Notes

References
 Enzo Catani, "L'attività archeologica di Luigi Pernier a Cirene dal 1925 al 1936", in Lidiano Bacchielli (ed.), Quaderni di Archeologia della Libya n. 18, pp. 235–255, 2002, 
 Editorial, "Prof. Luigi Pernier", Nature, 140, 495–496 (18 September 1937) .

1874 births
1937 deaths
Writers from Rome
Italian archaeologists
Italian classical scholars
Sapienza University of Rome alumni
Italian people of French descent
Academic staff of the University of Florence